Marshall Embleton Herbert (3 August 1877 – 26 May 1953) was an Australian rules footballer who played with Collingwood in the Victorian Football League (VFL).

Notes

External links 

Marshall Herbert's profile at Collingwood Forever

1877 births
1953 deaths
Australian rules footballers from Melbourne
Collingwood Football Club players
People from Brighton, Victoria